Boccia was the first cerebral palsy sport to be added to the Paralympic program in the 1984 Summer Paralympics.

Australia first started participating in the 1988 Summer Paralympics

Medal Tally

Summer Paralympic Games

1988 Seoul

Australia was represented by a team of four athletes:

Men - Burke Gibbons, Murray Parker, Donald Turton

Women - Lynette Coleman

Australia did not win any medals.

1992 Barcelona

Australia represented by: 

 Men – Burke Gibbons, Corey Molan,  Alexander Xeras 
 Women – Lyn Coleman 
 Officials – Tom Organ (Manager)

Australia did not win any medals.

1996 Atlanta

Australia represented by: 

 Men –  Kris Bignall, Scott Elsworth, Tu Huyhn, John Richardson 
 Women –  Lynette "Lyn" Coleman, Fiona Given 
 Coaches – Thomas Organ (Head), Ricky Grant 

The 1996 result was the best ever for an Australian team in Boccia, however they did not win any medals.

2000 Sydney

Australia represented in boccia by:

 Men - Warren Brearley, Scott Elsworth, John Richardson
 Women - Lyn Coleman, Angie McReynolds, Karen Stewart
 Coaches – Joan Stevens (Head),  Italo Vigalo
 Officials – Peggy Richardson, Barry Stewart, Sue Beencke, Annette Low, Emily Connell, Carla Brearley, June Kaese

Most athletes did not progress from the first round of pool games.  Scott Eslworth was the best performed athlete making the quarter-finals.

2004 Athens 

Australia did not participate

2008 Beijing

Australia did not participate

2012 London

Australia did not participate

2016 Rio 

Australia selected Daniel Michel and his ramp assistant Ashlee McClure for their debut Games. Michel is the first player since the 2000 Sydney Paralympics.

Australian Team at  2016 Summer Paralympics Detailed Results

2020 Tokyo

Team - Daniel Michel (ramp assistant Ashlee McClure), Spencer Cotie (ramp assistant Zoe Dix) and Jamieson Leeson  (ramp assistant Zoe Dix). Officials - Ken Halliday (Head Coach); Caroline Walker (Team Manager); Sarah Skidmore (Carer). 

Daniel Michel won the Bronze Medal in the Mixed individual BC3

Australian Team at the 2020 Summer Paralympics Detailed Results

See also
Boccia at the Summer Paralympics
Australia at the Paralympics

References

Australian Paralympic teams